The Pink Panthers Patrol (often shortened to Pink Panthers) were a civilian patrol group based in New York City, founded by members of Queer Nation in the summer of 1990 in order to combat anti-LGBT violence in Manhattan's West Village. They received notoriety when they were successfully sued in 1991 by MGM Pictures, the owner of the rights to the Pink Panther cartoon. The neighborhood watch group would patrol areas that had a large number of gang assaults on homosexual men. In NYC, where the Pink Panthers was founded these patrols would generally be in the East and West Village.  There was a number of patrols in  the rambles (Central Park).

Controversy 

 The main argument is that modeling after Black activism implicitly reduces the struggles and interests of the community.

See also

 Black Panther Party
White Panther Party
Rainbow Coalition
 List of LGBT rights organisations
 Pink capitalism

References

Further consideration
MGM-Pathe Communications v. Pink Panther Patrol, 1991 lawsuit

External links
 lespantheresroses.org (French/ English site)

Black Panther Party
International LGBT political advocacy groups
LGBT political advocacy groups in the United States